Glenlee may refer to:

Places

Australia 
 Glenlee, New South Wales
 Glenlee, Menangle Park, a heritage-listed property in the south-western Sydney suburb of Campbelltown, New South Wales
 Glenlee, Queensland, a locality in the Shire of Livingstone
 Glenlee, Victoria, in Shire of Hindmarsh, Australia

United Kingdom 
 Glenlee, Dumfries and Galloway, Scotland, featured in Gossip from the Forest
 Glenlee hydro-electric power station, a part of the Galloway hydro-electric power scheme

People 
Thomas Miller, Lord Glenlee

Other 
Glenlee (ship), museum ship in Glasgow, Scotland